Mumbai Champs was one of the nine teams that played in the defunct Indian Cricket League (ICL). The team was based in Mumbai, India and its captain was New Zealand batsman Nathan Astle.

Previous performance

References 

Indian Cricket League teams
Cricket clubs established in 2007
Cricket in Mumbai
2007 establishments in Maharashtra
Former senior cricket clubs of India